Georgii Merkulov (born October 10, 2000) is a Russian professional ice hockey forward currently playing for the Providence Bruins of the American Hockey League (AHL) as a prospect to the Boston Bruins of the National Hockey League (NHL). He previously played college ice hockey for Ohio State University of the National Collegiate Athletic Association (NCAA).

Playing career
Merkulov committed to play college ice hockey for the Ohio State University during the 2021–22 season. In his freshman year, he led all NCAA freshmen with 20 goals, and was named to the All-Big Ten Freshman Team and the All-Big Ten First Team.

On 9 April 2022, Merkulov concluded his collegiate career after he was signed to a three-year, entry-level contract with the Boston Bruins, and was assigned to their AHL affiliate, the Providence Bruins, where he would play for the remainder of the season.

Career statistics

Awards and honors

References

External links

2000 births
Living people
Russian ice hockey forwards
Sportspeople from Ryazan
Ohio State Buckeyes men's ice hockey players
Providence Bruins players
Youngstown Phantoms players